The Dyersburg State Gazette is a semi-weekly newspaper published in Dyersburg, Tennessee. The paper has served Dyersburg and Northwest Tennessee since 1865, and provides general news.

History
The Dyersburg State Gazette was purchased by Worrell Newspapers of Charlottesville, Virginia in 1971. The New York Times Company acquired 8 daily papers, including the Dyersburg State Gazette, from Worrell in 1982. Paxton Media Group purchased it from The New York Times Company in 1995. Current owner Rust Communications acquired the State Gazette in 2000.

References

External links
 
Dyersburg State Gazette

Newspapers published in Tennessee